Uniti Sweden was a Swedish automotive startup founded in January 2016 by Lewis Horne (CEO)  which aimed at developing a high-tech electric city car in Lund, Sweden.

Uniti started as an open innovation project at Lund University and evolved into an independent startup in January 2016. The company aimed at changing the automotive codes by redesigning the entire car, focusing on delivering a lightweight, digital first experience, as well as producing a completely climate-neutral car.

The company was initially funded through a series of crowdfunding campaigns, angel investors and institutional investors. The company had over 3000 investors from 40 countries. The company also conducted vehicle pre-order campaigns at Media Markt locations in Stockholm and Malmö, with VR test-drives available.

Uniti

Prototype and concepts 
Uniti publicly exhibited the one-piece cockpit concept, called Kepler Pod, for the first time during the 2016 CeBit event. The cockpit has been coupled with a virtual reality system to showcase the head-up display technology which will be featured in the car. Different exterior design concepts have been displayed during early 2017.

Initially, the two and four seater vehicles (depending on the version) were designed to comply with the regulatory vehicle category of 450 kg heavy quadricycles (L7e), like quads and e.g. the electric Renault Twizy.

To be lightweight and safe, sustainable composite biomaterials and carbon fibers will be used. Uniti vehicle was supposed to have 2 electric motors delivering a total output 15 kW (40 kW peak), which allows the vehicle to reach 0 to 80 km/h in less than 3.5 seconds with a top speed of 90 km/h to 130 km/h depending on the version. The urban electric car was supposed to have a Li-Ion battery which supports induction and plug-in charge, and capable of supplying 11 to 20 kWh of energy. Depending on the version, the range per charge varies from 150 km to 300 km. The Swedish car will feature technologies designed in-house such as a steer-by-wire system, an interactive HUD windscreen, a digital human-machine interaction capacity, as well as autonomous driving functions.

In February 2018, the company showcased a two-seater at the Auto Expo in Greater Noida, India. The company also announced a partnership with the Delhi-based Bird Group to bring a five-seater car to the Indian market by 2020.

Uniti One 
In July 2018, Uniti announced that both the 2-seater Uniti One and a later 4/5-seat model will be in the M1 class, like proper automobiles, which means that the Uniti cars will undergo the same crash tests and safety requirements as regular automobiles.

The Uniti One will be a 2-seat 100% electric city car, with internet access and innovative cockpit design comparable to using a smartphone. The asymmetric seat configuration, with the passenger behind the driver, is actually 1+1, like on a motorbike, or in the Renault Twizy. With less width and frontal area than a regular car, the Uniti One should be easier to handle and park in tight European cities, while having less drag and better range on interstate highways than most small electric cars. 
Modern safety features include a sensor suite and safety technologies (ADAS) to help avoid crashes before they happen. It is supposed to be Fleet Ready, prepared for the needs of businesses and car-sharing services, which may include sharing the car among relatives, friends, and neighbors without dealing with keys.

The target specifications, as of April 2019, include 240 km range, 130 km/h top speed, rear-wheel-drive dual motors with an output of 120 kW (163 hp). With power similar to a carbonfiber BMW i3, but at 900 kg gross weight less than that of a 2013 Smart ForTwo Electric Drive, the Uniti One should accelerate even quicker than these. The 26 kWh battery pack can be charged by DC fast charging (CCS Combo 2 for Europe) in 25 minutes from 20-80% state of charge, which equals to an average of 37 kW. The given values mean that the consumption is around 10,8 kWh per 100 km.

Production 
German industrial giant Siemens has entered into a partnership with the group to produce their Uniti two-seater electric car. In 2017, the company claimed that prototypes would be available later that year. The partners were planning to design a fully automated Industry 4.0 facility in Malmö, Sweden, to produce as many as 50,000 cars a year beginning in 2018. They were also considering a production facility in Adelaide, Australia, for distribution into the Asian market. Lewis Horne, the CEO of Uniti Sweden, said the deal gave his company "the opportunity to not only develop a sustainable car, but also manufacture it in a sustainable way at a large scale." Ola Janson of Siemens Industry Software said he was "really looking forward to having that partnership" between "Siemens as the very old, stable company, yet still innovative" and Uniti Sweden made up of "young people, innovative people, (who) don’t have the legacy, don’t have the limits like myself."

In late October 2018, Uniti switched course, as it announced plans to open its European pilot production plant at a business park in Silverstone, England, with 2-seaters expected in production by late 2019 or early 2020, followed a few months later by 4- and 5-seat versions. Among the advantages to the Silverstone Park plant are: access to design, engineering and production talent, supply chain access, as well as access to the UK auto market.

In 2019, the specifications for the first production vehicle were announced, and orders were opened via the website, requiring a 50% deposit. Unlike the prototype, it is now a 3-seater, and to be produced in Norwich. The car is available with a 12kWh or 24kWh battery, the former priced at £15,100 for a base model, making it the cheapest new electric car available to order in the UK as of November 2019

See also 
 List of highest-funded equity crowdfunding projects
 Electric car
 Electric car use by country
 Vehicle category
 Automotive industry in Sweden

References

External links 

 
 Smaller, lighter, greener: are micro EVs the future of city transport?
 Uniti Sweden: the diversity behind the electric car of the future
 Crowdfunded electric car to be manufactured in fully automated factory designed by Siemens
 Inside Uniti’s plan to build the iPhone of EVs
 How Norway's government made electric cars irresistible
 FundedByMe campaign page of Uniti
 Could this be the car of the future?
 Elbilsfabrik etableras i Skåne – vill ta in en halv miljard
 Swedish crowdfunding hit Uniti is becoming reality – 50,000 vehicles coming up

Electric city cars
Electric vehicle manufacturers of Sweden
Battery electric vehicle manufacturers
Microcars
Quadricycles
First car made by manufacturer
Car manufacturers of Sweden
Swedish brands